Stanley Dakosty Jr. (born January 2, 1983) is an American football coach who is currently the head coach at Colgate University. He also played college football at Colgate before suffering an injury and turning to coaching. Prior to being named head coach, Dakosty spent 15 of his 17-year coaching career with Colgate.

Head coaching record

References

External links 
 
 Colgate Raiders profile

1983 births
Living people
People from Hazleton, Pennsylvania
Players of American football from Pennsylvania
Coaches of American football from Pennsylvania
American football defensive backs
Colgate Raiders football players
Colgate Raiders football coaches
Amherst Mammoths football coaches